Amos Twinomujuni is a former Justice of the Supreme Court of Uganda.

See also
Judiciary of Uganda

References

External links
 Parliament Vets Appointed Judges
 Who Are the New Judges?

Ugandan judges
Year of birth missing (living people)
Living people
People educated at Ntare School